Since 1998, there have been 30 teams in Major League Baseball (MLB). It is very rare for a pitcher to record a win against every team. In earlier times, two factors made it nearly impossible to defeat all teams in both leagues (even before expansion increased the number to 30):

 Before the era of free-agency, in which players are free to move to another team at the end of their contract, a pitcher would play for only a few teams, and could not, of course, win a game against his own team.
 Before inter-league play began in June 1997, a pitcher would see only half of the 30 teams in any single season, unless traded to a team in the other league. Even with inter-league play, a pitcher may not have his spot in a typical 5-man rotation match the games in the single 3- or 4-game series against another team, and only a few teams from the other league are played in any season.

In any case, defeating all teams is more likely only if a pitcher has a long career. Assuming that good health and rotation timing allows a top notch pitcher to beat every one of his team's opponents in a season, it will still only be 19–20 teams (14 intraleague and 5 or 6 interleague), unless he is traded. It is far more likely that his wins will come against 10 to 12 teams, most of which he has already beaten.

30 team winners
, there have been 20 pitchers who have beaten all 30 teams. Only 14 teams have had a pitcher accomplish the feat while on their roster, with the San Francisco Giants and New York Yankees the only franchises to have three such pitchers: Randy Johnson, Barry Zito, and Tim Hudson for the Giants, and Kevin Brown, Javier Vázquez, and Gerrit Cole for the Yankees. Johnson is so far the only member to be elected to the National Baseball Hall of Fame.

Notes

Active pitchers approaching 30 wins

29 team winners
, seven active pitchers have defeated 29 teams. 
 Justin Verlander – has not defeated the Cincinnati Reds.
 Ervin Santana – has not defeated the Milwaukee Brewers.
 Scott Kazmir – has not defeated the Milwaukee Brewers.
 Aníbal Sánchez – has not defeated the Los Angeles Angels.
 Lance Lynn – has not defeated the Texas Rangers.
 Charlie Morton – has not defeated the Pittsburgh Pirates.
 Wade Miley – has not defeated the New York Yankees.

28 team winners
, six active pitchers have defeated 28 teams.
 Cole Hamels – has not defeated the Philadelphia Phillies or Toronto Blue Jays.
 Iván Nova – has not defeated the Colorado Rockies or Seattle Mariners.
 Trevor Bauer – has not defeated the Cleveland Guardians or New York Mets.
 Ian Kennedy – has not defeated the Texas Rangers or Toronto Blue Jays.
 Mike Minor – has not defeated the Atlanta Braves or Tampa Bay Rays.
 Yu Darvish – has not defeated the Baltimore Orioles or Texas Rangers.

27 team winners
, one active pitcher has defeated 27 teams.
 Rick Porcello – has not defeated the Cincinnati Reds, Milwaukee Brewers, or San Diego Padres.

26 team winners
, eight active pitchers have defeated 26 teams.
 Trevor Cahill – has not defeated the Arizona Diamondbacks, Atlanta Braves, Cincinnati Reds, or New York Mets.
  Carlos Carrasco — has not defeated the Cleveland Guardians, Los Angeles Dodgers, New York Mets, or St. Louis Cardinals.
 Johnny Cueto – has not defeated the Baltimore Orioles, Boston Red Sox, Tampa Bay Rays, or Texas Rangers.
 Dallas Keuchel - has not defeated the Cincinnati Reds, Houston Astros, Milwaukee Brewers, or San Francisco Giants.
 Corey Kluber - has not defeated the Chicago Cubs, Los Angeles Dodgers, Miami Marlins, or Pittsburgh Pirates.
 Clayton Kershaw - has not defeated the Baltimore Orioles, Boston Red Sox, New York Yankees, or Los Angeles Dodgers.
 David Price - has not defeated the Los Angeles Dodgers, New York Mets, San Francisco Giants, or St. Louis Cardinals.
 Jose Quintana — has not defeated the Arizona Diamondbacks, Chicago Cubs, Chicago White Sox, or Philadelphia Phillies.
 Adam Wainwright - has not defeated the Baltimore Orioles, New York Yankees, Texas Rangers, or St. Louis Cardinals.

References 

Major League Baseball lists
Major League Baseball records
Major League Baseball statistics
Baseball pitching